"It's Late" is the eleventh episode of the first season of Canadian teen drama series Degrassi Junior High. It aired in Canada on CBC on April 5, 1987. The episode was written by Yan Moore and directed by Kit Hood. In the episode, Christine "Spike" Nelson (Amanda Stepto) becomes pregnant after having sexual intercourse with Shane McKay (Bill Parrott) at a party. Meanwhile, Arthur (Duncan Waugh) gives Yick (Siluck Saysanasy) romantic counselling when the latter is in love with a girl.

The episode along with several others was banned from regular airing on the BBC, instead being aired in a later timeslot on BBC2. The episode won an International Emmy Award for Children and Young People, as well as a Gemini Award for director Kit Hood.

Plot 
In the cold open, several Degrassi students are attending a party thrown by Lucy Fernandez (Anais Granofsky). As Christine "Spike" Nelson (Amanda Stepto) and Shane McKay (Bill Parrott) are kissing near the door of a bedroom, Joey Jeremiah (Pat Mastroianni) and Derek "Wheels" Wheeler (Neil Hope) tease the two. Annoyed, Shane leads Spike into the dark bedroom. A short time later, Erica and Heather Farrell (Angela and Maureen Deiseach) try to call Spike from the room, but notice the door is locked and receive no answer.

After the opening, Spike arrives at Degrassi in a bad mood and fighting with her mother, and Mr. Raditch (Dan Woods) notes that she is late for the second time this week. During the class, Shane grins at Spike, and receives a cold stare back; after class, Spike lashes out at Erica, Heather, and Shane, who tries to tell her about Lucy holding another party.

Shane repeatedly refuses to disclose what occurred to Joey and Wheels. A shameful Spike confides to Erica and Heather about what happened at the party and Heather echoes a myth that you can't get pregnant the first time. Nonetheless, they console her.

At her mother's beauty salon, Spike asks her mother about the myth, which she rejects. The next day, Shane finally gets Spike's attention and asks her why she is giving him the cold shoulder, to which Spike reveals she may have a baby. Shane backs away slowly, stunned.

After school, Erica and Heather take Spike to Shoppers Drug Mart to purchase a pregnancy test. When she arrives home, she hides it behind her, causing her mother to inquire what is in the bag. After Spike lashes out, she throws the bag to her mother. When she finds it's a pregnancy test, the two embrace.

Later, at the clinic, Spike apologizes to her mother, and Shane arrives on foot across the street, which annoys her mother. The two then meet up and enter the clinic. Afterwards, when they exit the clinic, Spike confirms that she is pregnant, and she and her mother embrace as Shane looks on. Back at school, on a flight of stairs, Spike and Shane contemplate their options, including abortion, which Shane protests against. Spike laments; "I'm just a kid... why is this happening? It was just a little mistake." Shane responds, "Sort of a big mistake."

Production 

At the time, Kate Taylor, associate director at PBS and co-executive producer of Degrassi Junior High, explained that problems such as teenage pregnancy were reaching "a bit of a crisis point", and that it was necessary to address these subjects to help kids navigate through these issues.

The idea for a pregnant teen character was the result of various studies conducted by writer Loretta Castellarin, who later co-authored a novel based on the character, on teenage pregnancy statistics. Initially, the writers suggested making the provocatively-dressed character Stephanie Kaye pregnant, but decided not to, feeling it would be too predictable for a teenager of Stephanie's type. The reason Spike was chosen to be pregnant was because she was a "nice, quiet girl" that was well-liked, and would not be expected to have such a problem befall her. By having a pregnant teen character, the writers aimed to demonstrate that "just because someone's 14 and gets pregnant doesn't mean that she's a slut."

Also contributing to the idea of "It's Late" was Spike's actress, Amanda Stepto, who observed a rise in sexual activity among her peers and felt that the sex education programs offered at the time were failing to address it, claiming in 1988 that her own sex education class basically consisted of "diagrams and filling in the blanks". The producers of the show feared about the reception of the episode, and shot two endings to the scene, the alternate ending of which has never been released.

Cultural references 
In the episode, Wheels is shown in several scenes wearing a sweater for the Footscray Bulldogs (now Western Bulldogs), an Australian rules football team. Wheels' wearing of the sweater bewildered viewers in Australia and contributed to the show's cult following in the country.

Reception 
Degrassi writer and publicist Kathryn Ellis wrote that reactions to the episode, as well as the pregnancy storyline as a whole, ranged from "complete outrage" to "heartfelt gratitude". The episode received favourable reviews from Jim Bawden of The Toronto Star and John Haslett Cuff of The Globe and Mail. The BBC initially refused to air "It's Late" along with three other episodes of the series. However, the network later aired the episode on 3 October 1988 in their DEF II strand at 6:00pm. Amanda Stepto was thought to be pregnant in real life, with fans sending her baby clothing and asking her advice on sex and relationships. Discussing the episode in 2005, Stepto noted that she had received fan mail from other teenage mothers who appreciated the story line.

Accolades and legacy 
The episode received an International Emmy Award for Children and Young People in 1987. Upon accepting the International Emmy, Degrassi co-creator Kit Hood announced that if Spike's baby were to be a boy, it would be named after Ralph Baruch, the president of the Academy of Television Arts and Sciences. However, it was decided to make the baby a girl, and she was named Emma, after the Emmy. Emma, who first appears as a baby in the third season, would become the central character of Degrassi: The Next Generation, with Amanda Stepto returning in a recurring role as Spike. Kit Hood would also win a Gemini Award for Best Direction in a Dramatic or Comedy Series for his work on the episode in December 1987.

Miriam McDonald, who played Emma in The Next Generation, would later recall watching "It's Late" in her health class years prior to getting the role.

See also 
 Christine "Spike" Nelson, the central character of the episode.

References

External links 

 

1987 Canadian television episodes
Degrassi Junior High episodes
International Emmy Award winners
Degrassi episodes about teenage pregnancy
Television censorship in the United Kingdom